The Palm Treo 750v is a quad-band smartphone based on Microsoft's Windows Mobile 5.0 software. It was the first Treo model to be made available in Europe based on the Windows platform: previous Treo handsets were based on the Palm OS.

External links
 Official Palm Treo 750v information
 Review of the Treo 750v from 10 Nov 2006 by IT Week

Windows Mobile Professional devices
Palm mobile phones